The 18th Genie Awards were held on 14 December 1997, to honour the best Canadian films of 1997.

Nominees and winners
The Genie Award winner in each category is shown in bold text.

References

External links 
Genie Awards 1997 on imdb 

18
Genie
Genie